The Africa Movie Academy Award for Best Film by an African Living Abroad was an annual merit by the Africa Film Academy to reward the African filmmakers in the diaspora. The category was introduced in 2008 as Best Film African Diaspora and was cancelled after the 9th Africa Movie Academy Awards.

References

Lists of award winners
Africa Movie Academy Awards